Ronald Dean Verlin (born June 15, 1965) is an American college basketball coach and the former head coach of the men's basketball team at the University of the Pacific. He is also the twin brother of former Idaho Vandals men's basketball coach Don Verlin.

Head coaching record

 On December 12, 2015, 8 games into the season, Verlin was suspended indefinitely amid an NCAA investigation. On March 3 it was announced he had been let go by the university.

References

Living people
American men's basketball coaches
Basketball coaches from California
California State University, Sacramento alumni
College men's basketball head coaches in the United States
Nevada Wolf Pack men's basketball coaches
Pacific Tigers men's basketball coaches
1965 births